Malik Adnan Hayat Noon is a Pakistani politician and businessman who is the shareholder of Noon Pakistan and is a member of the Noon family of Pakistan. His wife Tahia Noon is also a politician.

He is a former member of the National Assembly of Pakistan.

References

Living people
Pakistani MNAs 1997–1999
Malik
Year of birth missing (living people)
Pakistani businesspeople
Place of birth missing (living people)